Jacco Eltingh and Paul Haarhuis were the defending champions, but were eliminated in the round robin competition when they withdrew from their third match.

Jonas Björkman and Todd Woodbridge won the title, defeating Richard Krajicek and Mark Petchey in the final, 6–4, 6–3.

Draw

Final

Group A

Group B

References
Senior Gentlemen's Invitation Doubles

Men's Senior Invitation Doubles